Majdan Krynicki is a village in the administrative district of Gmina Krynice, within Tomaszów Lubelski County, Lublin Voivodeship, in eastern Poland.

References

Villages in Tomaszów Lubelski County